Ceracupes arrowi is a beetle of the family Passalidae. It is found in Taiwan.

References

Passalidae
Beetles of Asia
Insects of Taiwan
Beetles described in 1911
Taxa named by Karl Borromaeus Maria Josef Heller